Taras Bulba is a historical drama film, based on the novel Taras Bulba by Nikolai Gogol. The movie was filmed on different locations in Ukraine such as Zaporizhia, Khotyn and Kamianets-Podilsky as well as in Poland. The official release was rescheduled several times; at first for the spring of 2008 but was finally released on April 2, 2009, to coincide with Gogol's bicentennial.  The author's edition of 1842, expanded and rewritten, and considered more pro-Russian, was used for the film (this also being the text that is familiar to most readers).

The film DVD was released in the United States under the alternate title The Conqueror in 2010, and in the UK in 2011 as Iron & Blood: The Legend of Taras Bulba.

Cast 
 Bohdan Stupka as  Taras Bulba
 Igor Petrenko as  Andriy Bulba
 Vladimir Vdovichenkov as  Ostap Bulba
 Magdalena Mielcarz as  Panna Elzhbeta
 Mikhail Boyarsky as  Cossack Moisei Shilo
 Vladimir Ilyin as  former ataman
 Yury Belyayev as  Kirdyaga, ataman
 Ada Rogovtseva as  Taras Bulba's wife
 Boris Khmelnitsky as   Beard
 Daniel Olbrychski as   Krasnevsky
 Sergey Bezrukov as   Narrator
 Liubomiras Laucevičius as   Polish Duke
 Pyotr Zaychenko as Metelitsa
 Les Serdyuk as Dmytro
 Aleksandr Dedyushko as Stepan Guska
 Ivan I. Krasko as Kasyan Bovdyug
 Sergey Dreyden as Yankel

Controversies
The film was partly financed by the Russian Ministry of Culture and has been criticized in Ukraine for being a part of political propaganda "resembling leaflets for Putin".

The director Vladimir Bortko has also stated that the movie aimed to show that "there is no separate Ukraine":

This view is strongly opposed by nationalistic Ukrainians. In Russia there were fears that the movie would exacerbate historical disagreements with Ukraine. On April 7, 2022, in the midst of the 2022 Russian invasion of Ukraine, the film was re-released to Russian cinemas.

The film was also cautiously watched in Poland, where its possible anti-Polish character was widely discussed and its propagandist elements examined. This was enhanced by the fact that the filmmakers added some scenes depicting Polish brutality to the original plot by Gogol.  The cover of the US DVD edition (titled The Conqueror) has the tagline "Between Fire and the Sword Lies a Hero", a possible underhand reference to Polish historical fiction book and film With Fire and Sword  (Polish: Ogniem i mieczem).

References

External links
Official trailer at Twitch
 Kino-Teatr.ru
 Kinoros.ru

2009 films
Films set in the 16th century
Russian historical adventure films
2000s Russian-language films
Films set in Ukraine
Films based on Taras Bulba
Films directed by Vladimir Bortko
2000s historical adventure films